The 2015–16 UMKC Kangaroos men's basketball team represented the University of Missouri–Kansas City during the 2015–16 NCAA Division I men's basketball season. The Kangaroos were led by third year head coach Kareem Richardson. They played their home games at the Municipal Auditorium and were members of the Western Athletic Conference. They finished the season 12–19, 4–10 in WAC play to finish in a tie for sixth place. They defeated Utah Valley in the quarterfinals of the WAC tournament to advance to the semifinals where they lost to New Mexico State.

Previous season
The Kangaroos finished the season 14–19, 8–6 in WAC play to finish in a tie for second place. They advanced to the semifinals of the WAC tournament where they lost to Seattle.

Departures

Incoming Transfers

2015 incoming recruits

Roster

Schedule

|-
!colspan=9 style="background:#006699; color:#FFCC00;"| Exhibition

|-
!colspan=9 style="background:#006699; color:#FFCC00;"| Non-conference regular season

|-
!colspan=9 style="background:#006699; color:#FFCC00;"| WAC regular season

|-
!colspan=9 style="background:#006699; color:#FFCC00;"| WAC tournament

References

Kansas City Roos men's basketball seasons
UMKC
UMKC Kanga
UMKC Kanga